Ringedalsvatnet is a lake in Ullensvang Municipality in Vestland county, Norway. The lake is the main reservoir for a hydroelectric power station in Tyssedal which provides electricity for the power intensive industries in the nearby town of Odda.

Due to the extensive regulation of the nearby lakes such as Langavatnet and Nybuvatnet in the mountains above this lake, several of the large waterfalls that once fed Ringedalsvatnet are no longer regularly flowing.  The Tyssestrengene and Ringedalsfossen waterfalls were once very notable waterfalls on the cliffs surrounding this lake.  The Trolltunga cliff overlooks this lake too, attracting many tourists and hikers each year.

See also
List of lakes in Norway

References

External links
Map of the lakes regulated by "Tyssefaldene" for hydropower plants

Lakes of Vestland
Ullensvang
Reservoirs in Norway